Katju may refer to:

 Katju Nagar, West Bengal, India

People with the surname
 Arundhati Katju (born 1982), lawyer qualified to practice in India and New York
 Brahma Nath Katju (born 1927), Indian judge and the Chief Justice of the Allahabad High Court
 Kailash Nath Katju (1887–1968), prominent politician of India
 Markandey Katju, an Indian jurist
 Shiva Nath Katju (1910–1996), Indian lawyer, judge and an Indian National Congress politician